The 1990–91 Slovenian Republic Cup was the last season of Slovenia's football knockout competition before the establishment of the Slovenian Football Cup. It was contested by all Slovenian clubs except Olimpija, with Yugoslav Inter-Republic League members joining in the round of 16. From there on clubs played by the East/West system to the final.

Round of 16

|colspan="3" style="background-color:#D0D0D0" align=left|East

|-
|colspan="3" style="background-color:#D0D0D0" align=left|West

|}

Quarter-finals

|colspan="3" style="background-color:#D0D0D0" align=left|East

|-
|colspan="3" style="background-color:#D0D0D0" align=left|West

|}

Semi-finals

|colspan="3" style="background-color:#D0D0D0" align=left|East

|-
|colspan="3" style="background-color:#D0D0D0" align=left|West

|}

Final

References
General

Slovenian Football Cup seasons
Cup
Slovenian Cup